The Magnificent Scoundrels (情聖) is a 1991 Hong Kong comedy film directed by Lee Lik-chi and starring Stephen Chow, Teresa Mo, Tien Niu, Amy Yip, Wu Ma, Roy Cheung, Yuen Wah and Mimi Chu, with special appearances by Karl Maka and Sandra Ng.

Plot
Romeo (Stephen Chow) is a mediocre con artist who crosses paths with Betsy Kwan (Teresa Mo), a fellow con artist. Together they impersonate various people and create numerous schemes to make money. Meanwhile, gangsters are making a scheme of their own.

Cast and roles
 Stephen Chow as Romeo / Ching Sing
 Teresa Mo as Betsy Kwan
 Tien Niu as Ping
 Amy Yip as Apple / Bor-bor
 Wu Ma as Fatt
 Roy Cheung as Brother Tai-te
 Yuen Wah as Brother Wah
 Mimi Chu as Black magic master
 Karl Maka as Master (special appearance)
 Sandra Ng as Jenny Chen (special appearance)
 Gabriel Wong as Driver in car crash
 Kwai Chung as Arm-wrestler
 Chan Yuet-yue as One of Master's wives

External links
 
  The Magnificent Scoundrels at Hong Kong Cinemagic
 

1991 films
1991 comedy films
Hong Kong slapstick comedy films
1990s Cantonese-language films
Films set in Hong Kong
Films shot in Hong Kong
Films directed by Lee Lik-chi
1990s Hong Kong films